Richard Charles Guest (born 10 July 1965) is a retired National Hunt jockey.

Background
Guest comes from an extensive horse racing family, his father Charles was a successful jockey and trainer.  Charles' brother Joe Guest was also a jockey who most notably won the Mildmay of Flete Chase in 1960 on Devon Customer.  Richard Guest's brother Rae is a well known jockey and trainer of flat racehorses.  His sister, Jane, is the widow of famous trainer Sir Henry Cecil.

After retiring as a jockey Richard Guest trained racehorses, lately from Ingmanthorpe Racing Stables. In May 2021 he was evicted from Ingmanthorpe Racing Stables having only trained one winner in Great Britain in the 2020.

Riding career
Early in his career as a jockey, Guest rode out at Sir Michael Stoute's yard including exercising the Derby winner Shergar.  Following this he joined Toby Balding near his home in Andover, and in his apprentice season of 1986 scored seven winners.  The following year, Guest won 20 races including Neblin in the County Hurdle at the Cheltenham Festival.

One of Guest's best known winners was Beech Road, who he partnered to victory in the 1989 Champion Hurdle at the Cheltenham Festival at a price of 50/1.

Guest achieved success at Aintree, initially in 1994 with Into The Red winning the Becher Chase.  However his biggest career win would come in 2001, during a controversially run Grand National due to weather conditions, where only 4 horses finished he won onboard Red Marauder a surprise 33/1 winner.

At one time during his career, Guest was charged with three non-trying attempts in a single season and rescinded his racing licence for 6 months at Perth Racecourse.

Cheltenham Festival winners (2) 

 Champion Hurdle - (1) Beech Road (1989)
 County Hurdle - (1) Neblin (1987)

Major wins
 Great Britain
 Champion Hurdle - (1) Beech Road (1989)

References

1965 births
Living people
English jockeys
People from Andover, Hampshire